Gonocephalus semperi, the Mindoro forest dragon, is a species of agamid lizard. It is found in the Philippines.

References

Gonocephalus
Reptiles of the Philippines
Reptiles described in 1867
Taxa named by Wilhelm Peters